Mary J. A. Wurm (her surname was originally Würm) (18 May 1860 in Southampton – 21 January 1938 in Munich) was an English pianist and composer.

Life and career
She was born as Mary Josephine Agnes Würm in England, the sister of Alice Verne-Bredt, Mathilde Verne, and Adela Verne. She lived in Stuttgart as a child, but later returned to London. She studied piano with Clara Schumann and composition with Charles Villiers Stanford. Wurm became a noted pianist, and in 1898 founded and conducted a women's orchestra in Berlin. Her nephew was John Vallier.

In 1914, Verne published a Practical Preschool collection to be used as teaching material at Elisabeth Caland in Hannover.

Works
Selected works include:

Mag auch heiss das Scheiden brennen
Christkindleins Wiegenlied aus des Knaben Wunderhorn (Text: Des Knaben Wunderhorn)
Wiegenlied im Sommer (Text: Robert Reinick)

See also
 Mathilde Verne

External links

References

1860 births
1938 deaths
English classical composers
British women classical composers
English classical pianists
English women pianists
Robert Schumann
Women classical pianists